The International Vegetarian Union (IVU) is an international non-profit organization whose purpose is to promote vegetarianism. The IVU was founded in 1908 in Dresden, Germany.

It is an umbrella organisation, which includes organisations from many countries, and often organises World and Regional Vegetarian Congresses. These alternate in two-year cycles.

Description

The ruling body from IVU is the International Council, and the members who form it are unpaid volunteers elected by the Member Societies at each World Vegetarian Congress.

Member organizations may be continental groups (EVU, VUNA, NAVS, etc.), local or other regional vegetarian organizations whose primary purpose is the promotion of vegetarianism and the support of vegetarian living (e.g. EarthSave).

The IVU also encourages regional and national organizations to run vegetarian festivals, such as the 43rd World VegFest in Sydney and Melbourne, Australia, on 25 October 2015 and the hundreds of currently organized vegetarian festivals on many continents.

The organization's 1975 World Vegetarian Congress in Orono, Maine, has been called the most significant event of the vegetarian movement in the United States in the 20th Century and led to the 1974 founding of the North American Vegetarian Society.

Notable members

 Bertrand P. Allinson
 H. Jay Dinshah
 Alex Hershaft
 Roberta Kalechofsky
 Gordon Latto (doctor)
 Howard Lyman
 Henry Bailey Stevens

Regional groups
 Asian Pacific Vegan Union (APVU) (formerly known as Asia Pacific Vegetarian Union)
 European Vegetarian Union (founded in 1988)
 Vegetarian Union of North America (preceded by the American Vegetarian Union 1949–1970s and the North American Vegetarian Society 1974–1987)
 South American Vegetarian Union
 Southeast Asian Vegetarian Union

See also
 List of vegetarian festivals
 List of vegetarian organizations
 Vegetarianism by country
 People for the Ethical Treatment of Animals

References

External links 
 

 
1908 establishments in Germany
Organizations established in 1908
Vegetarian organizations
Vegetarian publications and websites
Vegetarianism in Germany